The 1976 North Carolina lieutenant gubernatorial election was held on November 2, 1976. Democratic nominee James C. Green defeated Republican nominee William S. Hiatt with 66.04% of the vote.

Primary elections
Primary elections were held on August 17, 1976.

Democratic primary

Candidates
James C. Green, Speaker of the North Carolina House of Representatives
Howard Nathaniel Lee, former Mayor of Chapel Hill
John M. Jordan, State Representative
Waverly F. Akins, former Wake County Commissioner
Herbert L. Hyde, State Representative
Kathryne M. McRacken
C.A. Brown Jr.
E. Frank Stephenson Jr.

Results

Republican primary

Candidates
William S. Hiatt, former State Representative
R. Odell Payne, former State Representative

Results

General election

Candidates
Major party candidates
James C. Green, Democratic
William S. Hiatt, Republican

Other candidates
Arlis F. Pettyjohn, American

Results

References

1976
Gubernatorial
North Carolina